Dipankar Raychaudhuri (a.k.a. Ray) (born January 16, 1955) is the Director of Wireless Information Network Laboratory (WINLAB) and distinguished professor in the Electrical and Computer Engineering department at Rutgers University.

Education
Raychaudhuri obtained his B.Tech (Hons) in Electronics & Electrical Communications Engineering from the Indian Institute of Technology, Kharagpur in 1976, and the M.S. and Ph.D degrees from Stony Brook University in 1978 and 1979, respectively. His PhD was on the topic of code division multiple access (CDMA) under the guidance of the late Prof. Stephen Rapapport, who continued to be a mentor and close associate after graduation from SUNY StonyBrook.

Career
As a Distinguished Professor in Electrical & Computer Engineering, and Director of the WINLAB (Wireless Information Network Lab) at Rutgers University, Raychaudhuri is responsible for an internationally recognized industry-university research center specializing in wireless technology. He is also Principal Investigator for several large National Science Foundation funded projects including the "ORBIT" wireless testbed, the “MobilityFirst” future Internet architecture and the “COSMOS” Platforms for Advanced Wireless Research (PAWR) program.

Dr. Raychaudhuri has previously held corporate R&D positions including: Chief Scientist, Iospan Wireless (2000-01), Assistant General Manager & Department Head, NEC Laboratories (1993-99) and Head, Broadband Communications, Sarnoff Corporation (1990-92).  He obtained the B.Tech (Hons) from IIT Kharagpur in 1976 and the M.S. and Ph.D degrees from Stony Brook University in 1978, 79. He is a Fellow of the IEEE and the recipient of several professional awards including the Rutgers School of Engineering Faculty of the Year Award (2017), IEEE Donald J. Fink Award (2014), Indian Institute of Technology, Kharagpur, Distinguished Alumni Award (2012), and the Schwarzkopf Prize for Technological Innovation (2008).

Dr. Raychaudhuri is a leading researcher/technologist in the field of wireless networking based on his sustained technology contributions and leadership over the past 38 years. He is acknowledged as a pioneer who helped bring broadband wireless access technology from concept to reality in the 1990s. This is a technology domain (high speed WLAN, WiMax, etc.) which has made it possible for hundreds of millions of people connect to the Internet. Prof. Raychaudhuri is also recognized today in the US academic research community as a forward-looking network architect who is leading National Science Foundation supported R&D initiatives to innovate the future mobile Internet from a "clean slate" perspective (FIA), and to develop open, programmable wireless and network testbeds (ORBIT, GENI and COSMOS).  Finally, as director of WINLAB since ~2001-, he has led development of an internationally acclaimed academic research center specializing in wireless technology, and in this capacity plays a visible leadership role in advancing basic research and education in the field.

Dr. Raychaudhuri has also been active in technology entrepreneurship, helping to incubate startup companies in the wireless networking and media areas over the past 18 years. He serves as technical advisor or board member to several new technology companies, and has previously served on the advisory council of the NJ Economic Development Authority's Edison Innovation Fund. He has also served as editor of several leading journals including IEEE Transactions on Communications, IEEE/ACM Transactions on Networking and IEEE Communications Magazine. He has participated in several international standards committees in the telecom field, and has been an external advisor for several European and Japanese research projects and is currently a member of the international advisory council of the NICT.

Notable Achievements
Notable technology innovations by Prof. Raychaudhuri include design and implementation of one of the world's first broadband wireless local area networks. He published his concept for an ATM-based broadband wireless access network in a landmark paper (in IEEE J. Selected Areas in Communications, 1992) - this paper went on to become the 2nd most highly-cited journal paper in the communications field between 1990-2005 according to ISI Thomson-Reuters. Dr. Raychaudhuri's research group at NEC C&C Laboratories in Princeton subsequently demonstrated the feasibility of reliable 25 Mbps mobile services in the 5 Ghz band and successfully conducted proof-of-concept field trials as early as 1998. Other important research results in his career include design and prototyping one of the earliest VSAT (very small aperture terminal) data networks during the 1980s. This technology enabled the first generation of data networks in the US and is still used to provide Internet access to remote areas all over the world.  In the early 1990s he was a co-lead for a multi-company research team which designed one of the first HDTV systems tested by the FCC in 1991, significantly influencing the “ATSC” digital TV standard in wide use today. After joining Rutgers as a Professor, Dr. Raychaudhuri collaborated with Ivan Seskar (Chief Technologist at WINLAB) to build the "ORBIT radio grid testbed" the world's largest open research testbed for evaluation of future wireless networking protocols. During the period 2010-18, his group at WINLAB has also developed a novel clean-slate mobility-centric future Internet architecture called “MobilityFirst”, which proposes a new “named object” approach to Internet routing based on the use of globally unique identifiers (GUIDs) in place of conventional IP addresses. More recently, his research group at WINLAB has been leading a major NSF project funded under the Platforms for Advanced Wireless (PAWR) program aimed at deploying the city-scale, open/programmable COSMOS testbed in New York City for research on next-generation wireless networks with edge cloud capabilities.

Gallery
 
The wireless ATM network supports the delivery of multimedia information to portable computing devices of the future. Dipankar Raychaudhuri, Bob Siracusa, Cesar Johnston, Subir Biswas, and Max Ott demonstrate CCRL's WATMnet prototype. The NEC laptop computer in the foreground serves as a personal information appliance (PIA) which retrieves multimedia streams (such as MPEG video) over the microcellular wireless ATM network. The prototype system is capable of supporting standard ATM services at the portable terminal, with Quality-of-Service (QoS) control and handoff of active connections from one macrocell base station to another. The CCRL team has made seminal contributions to the field of wireless ATM, and has played a key role in forming a working group on this subject within the ATM forum.

— Text from NEC CCRL brochure, circa 1996

Book
“Emerging Wireless Technologies and the Future Mobile Internet”, Cambridge University Press, 2011.

Awards
ISI "most frequently cited author" in the field of communications during 1985-2005 (2006) 
Fellow of IEEE (1995)
Schwarzkopf Prize for Technological Innovation (2008)
IEEE Donald G. Fink Prize Paper Award (2014)
Faculty of the Year Award at Rutgers School of Engineering (2017)

References

External links

ORBIT
Dipankar Raychaudhuri at Rutgers University

1955 births
Living people
Indian computer scientists
Indian electrical engineers
IIT Kharagpur alumni
Stony Brook University alumni
Rutgers University faculty
Fellow Members of the IEEE
Place of birth missing (living people)